Veličná is a village and municipality in Dolný Kubín District in the Žilina Region of northern Slovakia.

Name
Veličná was first mentioned under the Latin name Magna Villa in a decree of Ladislaus IV of Hungary from 1272. In the middle ages, the town was known also under the name Welkeg Wsy (Veľké Vsy, The Big Village) and the Hungarized forms Nag Flaw and Naghffalva.

History
The settlement aroused in a relatively sparsely populated borderland area on an important trade route to Poland. In 1454 Veličná was already a smaller town. The town acquired several royal privileges (especially the privilege to trade with Polish salt) that positively influenced its economic development. In 1520, the town became the seat of  Orava County. In the 16th century, the region suffered several uprisings, therefore George Thurzo granted citizens additional privileges to improve the economic situation. In 1683, the town was burned by the Lithuanian troops led by Jan Kazimierz Sapieha the Younger moving to Battle of Vienna. The troops destroyed also the town and county archive. The seat of the county was moved to Dolný Kubín, Veličná was burned again (twice) in 1686 and never fully recover. The population was reduced during the plague epidemies (1732, 1739, 1742). In 1871, the town lost its status and became a village.

Geography
The municipality lies at an altitude of 462 metres and covers an area of 29.302 km². It has a population of about 1300 people. The biggest part of the village is called Revišné.

References

External links
Veličná village website (in Slovak)

Villages and municipalities in Dolný Kubín District